The Mini-Vanderbilt or "10K Knockout Teams" national bridge championship is held at the Spring American Contract Bridge League (ACBL) North American Bridge Championship (NABC).

The 10K Knockout Teams is a fixed three-day event. Half-day 28 board matches are played until such time as the field can play 56-board matches and complete the event in three days. This event is open to teams of four, five, or six members who must be ACBL Members with fewer than 10,000 masterpoints.

History

The inaugural 10K Knockout teams was held at the 2014 Spring NABC in Dallas, Texas.

Winners

Sources
 "Search Results: 10K Knockout Teams". 2014to present. ACBL. Visit "NABC Winners"; select a Spring NABC. Retrieved 2019-08-05.

References

North American Bridge Championships